Huntzinger is a surname. Notable people with the surname include:

 Brock Huntzinger (born 1988), American baseball pitcher
 Hugo Huntzinger (1934-1993), American National Park Service executive
 Jacques Huntzinger (born 1943), French ambassador
 Walt Huntzinger (1899–1981), American baseball pitcher